Appius Annius Trebonius Gallus may refer to:

 Appius Annius Trebonius Gallus (consul suffectus) 
 Appius Annius Trebonius Gallus (consul 108)